Bradley Stevenson (born 12 September 1998) is an English professional footballer who plays as a midfielder for Billericay Town.

Club career
On 30 August 2016, Stevenson made his Gillingham debut in their EFL Trophy tie against Luton Town, in which he replaced Mitchell Dickenson in the 60th minute during the 2–1 defeat.

Following his return from a successful loan stint with Cray Wanderers, Stevenson appeared for Gillingham in an EFL Trophy tie against Reading under-21's, which finished 7–5 to Gillingham at the end of 90 minutes. On 9 November 2017, Stevenson signed for Tonbridge Angels on a month-long loan.

In January 2019, Stevenson joined Margate on a month-long loan. On 22 March 2019, he was loaned out to Hastings United for the rest of the season together with his teammate Jack Tucker.

He was offered a new contract by Gillingham at the end of the 2018–19 season. In August 2019, Stevenson was released by Gillingham, joining Herne Bay a month later. On 29 November 2019, after five goals in ten games in all competitions for Herne Bay, Stevenson signed for Chelmsford City. On 23 January 2020, Chelmsford confirmed the departure of Stevenson from the club.

In the summer of 2021, Stevenson joined Welling United after a second spell with Herne Bay, linking up with Steve Lovell, the manager that gave him his Football League debut. 

In June 2022, Stevenson joined Billericay Town following their relegation to the Isthmian League Premier Division.

Career statistics

References

External links
 Official website

1998 births
Living people
People from Canterbury
Footballers from Kent
English footballers
Association football forwards
Gillingham F.C. players
Cray Wanderers F.C. players
Hastings United F.C. players
Tonbridge Angels F.C. players
Margate F.C. players
Herne Bay F.C. players
Chelmsford City F.C. players
Welling United F.C. players
Billericay Town F.C. players
English Football League players
National League (English football) players
Isthmian League players